Diego Andrés Cruz Esparza (born January 13, 1995) is a Mexican professional footballer who currently plays for Celaya on loan from Puebla. He played his first game for the team on October 29, 2016.

References

External links

1995 births
Living people
Association football defenders
Club Puebla players
Atlas F.C. footballers
Club Celaya footballers
Liga MX players
Ascenso MX players
Liga Premier de México players
Tercera División de México players
Footballers from Chihuahua
People from Chihuahua City
Mexican footballers